Donets, until May 2016 Chervonyi Donets, is an urban-type settlement in Izium Raion, Kharkiv Oblast, Ukraine. Donets hosts the administration of Donets settlement hromada, one of the hromadas of Ukraine. Population: 

Donets is located on the right bank of the Donets River.

History
Urban-type settlement since 1959.

In January 1989 the population was 9653 people. In January 2013 the population was 8997 people.

On 19 May 2016, Verkhovna Rada adopted decision to rename Chervonyi Donets to Donets conform to the law prohibiting names of Communist origin.

Until 18 July 2020, Donets belonged to Balakliia Raion. The raion was abolished in July 2020 as part of the administrative reform of Ukraine, which reduced the number of raions of Kharkiv Oblast to seven. The area of Balakliia Raion was merged into Izium Raion.

Economy

Transportation
Donets has access (via a bridge) to the R78 Highway connecting Kharkiv and Balakliia, and is also connected by road with Pervomaiskyi.

References

Urban-type settlements in Izium Raion